Shemaiah is the name of several people in the Hebrew Bible (Hebrew: שמעיה shemayah "God Heard"):
a Levite in the time of David, who with 200 of his relatives took part in the bringing up of the ark from Obed-edom to Hebron (I Chronicles 15:8)
the eldest son of Obed-edom (I Chronicles 26:4-8)
Shemaiah son of Nethanel, a scribe mentioned as active at the death of David (I Chronicles 24:6)
Shemaiah, a prophet in the reign of Rehoboam (I Kings 12:22-24; II Chronicles 11:2-4; 12:5)
one of the Levites whom Jehoshaphat appointed to teach the law (II Chronicles 17:8)
Shemaiah, the father of Shimri, listed as a  Simeonite five generations before the reign of Hezekiah (I Chronicles 4:37)
Shemaiah son of Jeduthun, a Levite in the time of Hezekiah (II Chronicles 29:14)
a Levite appointed to "distribute the oblations of the Lord" during the reign of Hezekiah (II Chronicles 31:15)
a Levite in the time of Josiah (II Chronicles 35:9)
the father of Urijah the prophet (Jeremiah 26:20)
the father of a prince in the reign of Jehoiakim (Jeremiah 36:12)
Shemaiah the Nehelamite, a false prophet who went with the captives to Babylon and who opposed Jeremiah  (Jeremiah 29:24, 31-32).
Shemaiah son of Galal, a Levite listed as the father of a man living in the city of Jerusalem after the end of the Babylonian captivity (I Chronicles 9:16)
Shemaiah son of Shechaniah, listed among those who made repairs to the wall of Jerusalem in Nehemiah 3:29
Shemaiah son of Delaiah, a false prophet who hindered the rebuilding of Jerusalem (Nehemiah 6:10)
a priest involved in the dedication of the wall of Jerusalem (Nehemiah 12:42)
Shemaiah the son of Hasshub, a Levite listed as living in the city of Jerusalem after the end of the Babylonian captivity (I Chronicles 9:14; Nehemiah 11:15)
a prince of Judah who assisted at the dedication of the wall of Jerusalem (Nehemiah 12:34-36)

The second book of Chronicles refers to a "Book of the Prophet Shemaiah". No existing work has been identified with this title (see Lost books of the Old Testament).

See also
Shema (disambiguation)
Shemaiah (disambiguation)
List of minor biblical figures, L–Z#S

Set index articles on Hebrew Bible people